Lipoexpediency refers to the beneficial effects of lipids in a cell or a tissue, primarily lipid-mediated signal transmission events, that may occur even in the setting of excess fatty acids. The term was coined as an antonym to lipotoxicity.

See also 
 Lipotoxicity

References 

Cell signaling
Lipids
Metabolism